Caged No More is a 2016 American drama film directed by Lisa Arnold and written by Lisa Arnold and Molly Venzke. The film stars Kevin Sorbo, Loretta Devine, Cynthia Gibb, Madison De La Garza, Cassidy Gifford and Dallas Lovato. The film was released on January 22, 2016, by Freestyle Releasing.

Plot
A woman (Loretta Devine) and a former Special Forces soldier (Alan Powell) try to stop a man (Kevin Sorbo) from trafficking his two young daughters in Europe.

Cast
Kevin Sorbo as Richard / Jack
Loretta Devine as Aggie
Cynthia Gibb as Lottie
Madison De La Garza as Constanza
Cassidy Gifford as Skye
Dallas Lovato as Alicia
Debra Wilson as Leona
Alan Powell as Will
Christos Vasilopoulos as Aeton
Stella Allen as Young Skye
George Kosturos as Galen
Abigail Duhon as Elle
Danielle Beckwith as Julie
Shawn-Caulin Young as Zach
Grayson Berry as Matt
Jay Amor as Serge Thug
Patrick Kearns as Police Officer
Ladson Deyne as Kostas
John Teal Jr. as Brute
Madelon Curtis as Madame
Sokratis Alafouzos as Christos
Johnny Stassi as Serge
Anthony Evans as Tyler
Alex Johnson as Casey

Release
The film was released on January 22, 2016, by Freestyle Releasing.

Despite a teaser at the end of the film, there is no known sequel to the film.

References

External links
 
 
 Today Show interview, January 15, 2016

2010s American films
2010s English-language films
2016 drama films
2016 films
American drama films